Vermilion Bay Water Aerodrome  is located  northwest of the community of Vermilion Bay on Long Lake in the Township municipality of Machin, Kenora District, Ontario, Canada.

See also
 Vermilion Bay Airport

References

Registered aerodromes in Kenora District
Seaplane bases in Ontario